Dahood "David" Qaisi (born May 12, 1991) is an American professional soccer  player who formerly played for professional indoor soccer team Harrisburg Heat of the Major Arena Soccer League.

College
Qaisi graduated from Conestoga Valley High School before enrolling at Lock Haven University in 2009. He was a key contributor in defense all 4 years and captained the squad his senior season. He tallied 65 total appearances for the Bald Eagles netting 5 goals. Qaisi’s impressive play in 2011 earned him a spot on the PSAC Second Team and PSAC First Team in 2012.

Professional

Shabab Al-Khalil 
After graduation from Lock Haven University, Qaisi signed with West Bank professional soccer club, Shabab Al-Khalil SC of the Premier League on July 19, 2013. He made his professional debut on July 29, 2013, in Shabab Al-Khalil SC's first game of the preseason against Hilal Al-Quds. He enjoyed a brief stint there making 16 appearances and scoring 3 goals to help win the Palestine Super Cup tournament and the West Bank Super Cup.

Harrisburg Heat 
Qaisi returned to the states to sign with the Harrisburg Heat. He made his Heat debut and scored 2 goals for the Heat in a preseason friendly against the New Jersey Dynamo.

Al-Shabab Al-Arabi Club 

In January 2014, Qaisi signed a contract with Al Shabab Club for the 2014 - 2015 season in Dubai of the United Arab Emirates.

Harrisburg Heat 

He returned to the states once again to sign with the Harrisburg Heat.

Retirement 
Qaisi now resides in Gainesville, FL where he is attending University of Florida College of Dentistry.

In Summer of 2021 Qaisi began his second year, where he worked in the simulation lab.

According to a post on Qaisi's instagram, he is now training with a hand piece and using Surgitel Loupes as an aspiring dentist.

As of Summer 2022, Qaisi is entering his third year of dental school. A stellar first two years of school has Qaisi sitting firmly in the upper middle of the class ranks. He has no tentative plans to specialize and in 2021 was quoted: "Bro, I'm just ready to graduate and make some money".

References

1991 births
Living people
American soccer players
Association football central defenders